Georgios Theotokis (1844 in Corfu – 12 January 1916 in Athens) was a Greek politician and Prime Minister of Greece, serving the post four times. He represented the Modernist Party or Neoteristikon Komma (NK).

Biography 
He was the third child of Corfiote Nikolaos Andreas Theotokis. After graduating from the Ionian high school, he enrolled at the Law School of the Ionian University. In 1861 he received his law degree from the Ionian University with a scholarship and continued his studies at the Sorbonne in Paris.

Upon his return to Corfu he worked as a lawyer. In 1879 he took part in the municipal elections and was elected mayor with a percentage of 65%. In 1883 he was re-elected mayor only to leave in 1885 at the invitation of Charilaos Trikoupis, to become a member of the Hellenic Parliament for the Trikoupis party.

In May 1886 Trikoupis appointed him Minister for Naval Affairs. As a minister Theotokis ordered the battleships Spetsai, Hydra and Psara. He also improved drastically the condition of the Navy by promoting better training and establishing many naval academies and schools. Later Trikoupis appointed him Minister of Ecclesiastical Affairs and Public Education. With the aid of professor Papamarkos, Theotokis prepared and submitted to Parliament progressive legislation for the improvement of education in Greece. However the legislation was never passed due to the opposition of Deliyannis.

From mid-1903 to 1909 Theotokis became three more times Prime Minister of Greece, the third time being the longest at the prime minister's post. Among his achievements are the organisation and strengthening of the army, including the adoption of modern khaki uniforms. He provided assistance for the Macedonian Struggle and is noted for his calm and deliberate foreign policy in the tense period just prior to the Balkan wars.

His grandson Georgios Rallis, who also became prime minister, has criticized him for two, in his opinion, important mistakes. Namely because in the days leading to the disastrous Greco-Turkish War of 1897 he did not oppose sending the Hellenic army to Crete, that led to the outbreak of the war. The second mistake was Theotokis' refusal to mediate between King Constantine I of Greece and Prime Minister Eleftherios Venizelos during 1915–1916, a disagreement that eventually grew to become the National Schism.

Georgios Theotokis, however, is considered by many to be a politician distinguished for his high ethics, calm demeanor and controlled temper, qualities not often found among politicians of his era.

As a mayor of Corfu, Georgios Theotokis approved construction for the Municipal Theatre of Corfu in 1885.

Cabinets

First Cabinet, April 14, 1899 – November 25, 1901

Prime Minister: Georgios Theotokis
Minister for Foreign Affairs: Athos Romanos
Minister for the Interior: Georgios Theotokis
Minister for War: Konstantinos Koumoundouros
replaced on January 11, 1900, by Nikolaos Tsamandos
Minister for Finance: Anargiros Simopoulos

Second Cabinet, June 27, 1903 – July 11, 1903
Prime Minister: Georgios Theotokis
Minister for Foreign Affairs: Georgios Theotokis
Minister for the Interior: Nikolaos Levidis
Minister for War: Alexios Grivas
Minister for Finance: Anargiros Simopoulos

Third Cabinet, December 19, 1903 – December 29, 1904
Prime Minister: Georgios Theotokis
Minister for Foreign Affairs: Athos Romanos
Minister for the Interior: Giorgios Theotokis
Minister for War: Konstantinos Smolenskis
Minister for Finance: Anargiros Simopoulos
replaced on October 10, 1904, by Nikolaos Kalogeropoulos

Fourth Cabinet, December 21, 1905 – July 29, 1909
Prime Minister: Georgios Theotokis
Minister for Foreign Affairs: Alexandros Skouzas (left office on 21 June 1908
replaced on July 5, 1908, by Giorgios Baltatzis
Minister for the Interior: Nikolaos Kalogeropoulos
Minister for War: Georgios Theotokis
Minister for Finance: Anargyros Simopoulos
replaced on January 8, 1908, by Nikolaos Kalogeropoulos
replaced on July 5, 1908, by Dimitrios Gounaris
replaced on February 28, 1909, by Nikolaos Kalogeropoulos

References

Sources
Georgios Rallis: "Georgios Theotokis: Politician of the measured response" (In Greek), Ελληνική Ευρωεκδοτική, Αθήνα 1986, 355 p. .

External links
 «Georgios Theotokis: Politician of the measured response and of calm manners»– Article by Georgios Rallis in the newspaper Τα Νέα, 18 October 1999.

1844 births
1916 deaths
19th-century prime ministers of Greece
20th-century prime ministers of Greece
Mayors of Corfu (city)
University of Paris alumni
Foreign ministers of Greece
Prime Ministers of Greece
Ministers of Naval Affairs of Greece
MPs of Corfu
New Party (Greece) politicians
History of Greece (1863–1909)
Honorary Knights Grand Cross of the Royal Victorian Order
Theotokis family
Politicians from Corfu